The 1865 Rangitikei by-election was a by-election held on 10 July 1865 in the  electorate during the 3rd New Zealand Parliament.

The by-election was caused by the resignation of the incumbent MP William Fox.

The by-election was won by Robert Pharazyn. As he was the only candidate nominated, he was duly declared elected.

References

Rangitikei 1865
1865 elections in New Zealand
Politics of Rangitikei
July 1865 events